Riddle is a surname. Notable people with the name include:

Albert G. Riddle (1816–1902), U.S. Representative for Ohio
Almeda Riddle (1898–1986), American folk singer
Chase Riddle (1925–2011), American baseball player, coach, manager, and scout
Edward Riddle (1788–1854), English astronomer and mathematician
George R. Riddle (1817–1867), American lawyer-politician
Howard Riddle (born 1947), English judge
Jeff C. Riddle (1863–1941), American Indian historian of the Modoc War
Jeremy Riddle (b. 1977), American Christian musician
Jimmy Riddle (1918–1982), American country musician
John Paul Riddle (1901–1989), co-founder of Embry-Riddle Aeronautical University
Johnny Riddle (1905–1998), American baseball player
J. T. Riddle (born 1991), American baseball player
Matt Riddle (born 1986), American professional wrestler and mixed martial artist
Nelson Riddle (1921–1985), American bandleader
Oscar Riddle (1877–1968), American biologist
Paul T. Riddle (born 1953), original drummer of The Marshall Tucker Band
Robert M. Riddle (1812–1858), mayor of Pittsburgh, Pennsylvania 
Ruth Riddle (1964–), Canadian Branch Davidian 
Samuel Riddle (1800–1888), textile manufacturer in Glen Riddle, Pennsylvania
Samuel D. Riddle (1861–1951), stable owner at Glen Riddle Farm
Stu Riddle (born 1976), New Zealand footballer
Theodate Pope Riddle (1867–1946), American architect
Toby Riddle (1848–1920), Modoc interpreter
Troy Riddle (born 1981), American ice hockey player

Fictional characters 
Lord Voldemort, the primary antagonist in J. K. Rowling's Harry Potter books, who was born "Tom Marvolo Riddle".

See also
 Riddles (surname)